John Joseph McCort (February 16, 1860 – April 21, 1936) was an American prelate of the Catholic Church. He served as Bishop of Altoona from 1920 until his death in 1936.

Biography

Early life and education
John McCort was born on February 16, 1860, in Philadelphia, Pennsylvania, to James and Sarah (née McCrystal) McCort, who were natives of Ireland. His father died during the Civil War, having enlisted in the 110th Pennsylvania Infantry Regiment. McCort received his early education under the Christian Brothers at the parochial school of St. Michael's Church, which later became La Salle College High School. After completing his courses there, he studied at La Salle College and then entered St. Charles Borromeo Seminary in 1876 to prepare for the priesthood.

Priesthood
McCort was ordained a priest on October 14, 1883, by Bishop Jeremiah F. Shanahan. A few months shy of the canonical age of 24, he was granted a special dispensation to be ordained due to health issues. Following his ordination, he was immediately appointed to the faculty of St. Charles Borromeo Seminary, where he taught Latin, rhetoric, mathematics, Church history, and liturgy for the next 16 years. In June 1899, he was appointed to succeed John W. Shanahan as pastor of Our Mother of Sorrows Church in the Mill Creek neighborhood of West Philadelphia.

McCort served as pastor of Our Mother of Sorrows until 1920, also being named fiscal procurator of the Archdiocese of Philadelphia in 1905, a monsignor in 1910, and vicar general of the archdiocese in 1911.

Auxiliary Bishop of Philadelphia
On June 28, 1912, McCort was appointed auxiliary bishop of Philadelphia and titular bishop of Azotus by Pope Pius X. He received his episcopal consecration on the following September 17 from Archbishop Edmond Francis Prendergast, with Bishops John W. Shanahan and John Edmund Fitzmaurice serving as co-consecrators, at the Cathedral of Saints Peter and Paul. As auxiliary bishop, he assisted Archbishop Prendergast with the administration of the archdiocese while retaining his role as pastor of Our Mother of Sorrows. He was instrumental in founding Misericordia Hospital (now Mercy Philadelphia Hospital) and West Philadelphia Catholic High School for Boys.

On June 22, 1916, McCort was notified of his appointment as Bishop of Monterey-Los Angeles by Pope Benedict XV. However, Archbishop Prendergast wrote to Rome with McCort's consent to rescind the appointment, so that McCort could continue to assist the ailing archbishop in Philadelphia. Pope Benedict accepted Prendergast's request in November that year.

Following Prendergast's death a little over a year later in February 1918, there was considerable public support for McCort's appointment as archbishop. However, the appointment ultimately went to Dennis Joseph Dougherty, the Bishop of Buffalo and McCort's former colleague at St. Charles Borromeo Seminary. McCort had a strained relationship with Dougherty, especially after McCort resigned from several diocesan positions following Dougherty's appointment.

Bishop of Altoona
On January 27, 1920, McCort was appointed coadjutor bishop with the right of succession to Bishop Eugene A. Garvey of the Diocese of Altoona. Upon Garvey's death on October 22 that year, McCort succeeded him as the second Bishop of Altoona.

Upon McCort's arrival in 1920, the Diocese of Altoona contained 148 priests, 110 churches, 91 parishes, 42 parochial schools, and a Catholic population of 123,756. By the time of his death in 1936, there were 197 priests, 129 churches, 111 parishes, 50 parochial schools, and a Catholic population that had fallen to 100,634 during the Great Depression. McCort laid the cornerstone for the new Cathedral of the Blessed Sacrament in May 1926 but construction temporarily came to a halt in 1929 due to the stock market crash, with the cathedral's dedication taking place in September 1931. In 1922, McCort established Altoona Catholic High School (now Bishop Guilfoyle High School) and Johnstown Catholic High School (renamed Bishop McCort High School in 1962). On the occasion of his golden jubilee as a priest in October 1933, McCort was named an assistant to the papal throne by Pope Pius XI.

In February 1936, McCort was admitted to Mercy Hospital at Johnstown after receiving injuries from a fall during a visit in Philadelphia. His health began to fail and he was in a coma for several days before his death on April 21, 1936. He is buried in the crypt of the Cathedral of the Blessed Sacrament.

References

External links

1860 births
1936 deaths
20th-century Roman Catholic bishops in the United States
Clergy from Philadelphia
St. Charles Borromeo Seminary alumni